Lee Jeong-hyeong (born 21 February 1977) is a South Korean swimmer. He competed in the men's 200 metre butterfly event at the 1996 Summer Olympics.

References

External links
 

1977 births
Living people
South Korean male butterfly swimmers
Olympic swimmers of South Korea
Swimmers at the 1996 Summer Olympics
Place of birth missing (living people)